Sociedade Esportiva Palmeiras B, usually called Palmeiras B, was a Brazilian football team from São Paulo. They were the reserve team of Sociedade Esportiva Palmeiras and stopped their activities in 2013. Palmeiras B's last match was a draw home against Sertãozinho.

Season to season

Achievements
Palmeiras B won the following competitions:

Algisto Lourenzatto Trophy (Brazil):
 Winners (1): 2000

IFA Shield (IFA) (India):
 Runners Up(1): 2001 (Disqualified after starting a brawl)

China-Brazil Tournament (China):
 Winners (1): 2004

Estudiantes de La Plata Centennial Trophy (Argentina):
 Winners (1): 2005

Blumenau Trophy (Brazil):
 Winners (1): 2005

Nereu Ramos Trophy (Brazil):
 Winners (1): 2005

Bellinzona International Tournament (Switzerland):
 Winners (1): 2007

Taiyuan City Trophy (China):
 Winners (1): 2011

References

External links
 Palmeiras Official Site 
 Palmeiras B at the São Paulo State Football Federation official website 

Palmeiras B
Palmeiras B
Palmeiras B
Palmeiras B
Palmeiras B
Palmeiras B
Palmeiras B